Datus Ensing Coon (1831 - 1893) was a newspaper publisher, Union Army officer during the American Civil War, planter, and state politician in Alabama. He was a delegate to the 1875 Alabama Constitutional Convention and a fraternal order of veterans president in San Diego, California. He served as a state legislator during the Reconstruction era in Alabama. representing Dallas County, Alabama in the Alabama House of Representatives. He served on investigating committee evaluating corruption allegations against U.S. Senator George E. Spencer.

He was born in New York. He worked on a farm in Iowa with his father before starting a newspaper. During the American Civil War he served as Colonel of the 2nd Iowa Cavalry Regiment and eventually commanded a cavalry brigade.

In 1872 he was documented as an inspector in the 2nd District of Alabama. A specimen of gypsiferous marl from him in Selma, Alabama was documented in an agricultural report in 1872.

He served as U.S. Commercial Agent in Baracoa, Cuba.

He moved to San Diego in 1878 to serve as a "Chinese Inspector" (Chinese Exclusion Act). He was a leading member of the Grand Army of the Republic (G.A.R.) in San Diego and was accidentally shot in 1893. The organization named one of its posts for him.

He is buried at Mt. Hope Cemetery in San Diego.

Further reading
''An Illustrated History of Southern California: Embracing the Counties of San Diego, San Bernardino, Los Angeles and Orange, and the Peninsula of Lower California, The Lewis Publishing Company, Chicago 1890 pages 291 and 292

References

External links
Findagrave entry

1831 births
1893 deaths
American planters
People from Dallas County, Alabama
People from New York (state)
Farmers from Iowa
People of Iowa in the American Civil War
Union Army colonels
19th-century American military personnel
People from San Diego
Date of birth missing
Date of death missing
Military personnel from California